Wyre is a local government district with borough status in Lancashire, England. The population of the non-metropolitan district at the 2011 census was 107,749. The district borders the unitary authority area of Blackpool as well as the districts of Lancaster, Ribble Valley, Fylde and Preston. The council is based in Poulton-le-Fylde. The district is named after the River Wyre, which runs through the district.

The district is a rare contemporary example of a non-contiguous local government area. There are no road or rail connections between the parts of the borough divided by the River Wyre, and it is necessary to travel through the Fylde district in order to travel between the two divided parts of Wyre, or else use the passenger ferry between Fleetwood and Knott End. The borough also includes parts of Blackpool built-up area.

History
The district was created on 1 April 1974 under the Local Government Act 1972, as a non-metropolitan district covering the territory of five former districts, which were abolished at the same time:
Fleetwood Municipal Borough
Garstang Rural District
Poulton-le-Fylde Urban District
Preesall Urban District
Thornton-Cleveleys Urban District

Subdivisions

Civil parishes

Unparished area
Poulton-le-Fylde, Thornton-Cleveleys and Carleton

Council

Elections to Wyre Borough Council take place every four years on the first Thursday in May. All 55 councillors are elected from 26 wards. Since the formation of the council in 1973 it has been under the control of the Conservative Party with the exception of one term from 1995 to 1999 when the Labour Party held control of the council.

Following the most recent election held on 2 May 2019 the composition of the council is as follows:

The leader of the council since December 2017 has been David Henderson, a Conservative. The next election is due in 2023.

Premises

The council is based at the Civic Centre on Breck Road in Poulton-le-Fylde. The building was originally a large house called Woodlands, later serving as a convalescent hospital and teacher training college before becoming the council's headquarters in 1988.

Parliament
Wyre is split into three Parliamentary Constituencies - Wyre and Preston North, Lancaster and Fleetwood and Blackpool North and Cleveleys. This was recently changed as part of the Boundary changes for the 2010 United Kingdom general election. Before this change it had been split into three Lancaster and Wyre, Blackpool North and Fleetwood and Fylde.

Freedom of the Borough
The following people and military units have received the Freedom of the Borough of Wyre.

 Doreen Lofthouse : 13 June 2003.
 The Duke of Lancaster's Regiment: 12 April 2018.

External links
Wyre Council website

References

 
Local government in the Borough of Wyre
Non-metropolitan districts of Lancashire
Boroughs in England